Hobo is the second album by British singer-songwriter Charlie Winston.  It was released by Real World Records in 2009.

The first single was "Like a Hobo".

Track listing
 "In Your Hands" (3:51)
 "Like a Hobo" (3:39)
 "Kick the Bucket" (2:39)
 "I Love Your Smile" (4:39)
 "My Life as a Duck" (3:41)
 "Boxes" (4:41)
 "Calling Me" (4:38)
 "Tongue Tied" (4:41)
 "Soundtrack to Falling in Love" (4:52)
 "Generation Spent" (4:18)
 "Every Step" (3:40)
 "My Name" (4:28)

Deluxe edition
Disc 1: Hobo
 "In Your Hands" (3:51)
 "Like a Hobo" (3:39)
 "Kick the Bucket" (2:39)
 "I Love Your Smile" (4:39)
 "My Life as a Duck" (3:41)
 "Boxes" (4:41)
 "Calling Me" (4:38)
 "Tongue Tied" (4:41)
 "Soundtrack to Falling in Love" (4:52)
 "Generation Spent" (4:18)
 "Every Step" (3:40)
 "My Name" (4:28)
 "Kick the Bucket" (Single Version) (3:06)
 "I’m a Man" (5:55)
 "I Love Your Smile" (Extended Version) (4:16)
 "Boxes" (Live in Rome) (3'37)
Disc 2: DVD
 Documentary 40'
 "Like a Hobo"
 "In Your Hands"
 "Kick the Bucket"

Charts and sales

Weekly charts

Year-end charts

Sales

References

External links
 The official Charlie Winston website
 Charlie Winston's profile on MySpace

2009 albums
Albums produced by Mark Plati
Charlie Winston albums
European Border Breakers Award-winning albums